In the state of New York, the common law felony murder rule has been codified in New York Penal Law § 125.25.  The New York version of the rule provides that a death occurring during the commission of certain felonies becomes second degree murder.

Affirmative defenses
The rule also provides an affirmative defense.    The defendant has an affirmative defense if the crime was committed in a group and they:
Did not actually commit, solicit, or aid the homicide, and
Were not armed with a deadly weapon, and
Had no reason to believe that another participant carried a deadly weapon, and
Had no reason to believe that another participant intended to engage in conduct likely to cause death or serious bodily injury

See also
 Law of New York

References

Murder in New York (state)
New York (state) law
U.S. state criminal law